The Samsung Galaxy Fit S5670 is a smartphone manufactured by Samsung that runs the open source Android operating system.

It was announced at the 2011 Mobile World Congress as one of four Samsung low-end smartphones, along with the Galaxy Ace, Galaxy Gio and Galaxy Mini.

Key features
 Multi-touch capacitive touchscreen
 Quad-Band GSM and dual-band 3G support
 7.2Mbit/s HSDPA
  65K-color QVGA TFT touchscreen
 Qualcomm Snapdragon S1 MSM7227 system-on-chip
 ARMv6 (ARM11) 600 MHz CPU
 Adreno 200 GPU
 286 MB RAM
 160 MB internal storage, hot-swappable MicroSD slot, 2 GB card included
 Android OS v2.2.1 (Froyo) with TouchWiz v3.0 UI, upgradable to v9 (Pie)
 5 MP camera with auto-focus and geo-tagging
 GPS receiver with A-GPS
 FM radio with RDS and Radio Text
 3.5 mm audio jack
 Quick Office
 Accelerometer and proximity sensor
 Swype virtual keyboard
 MicroUSB port (charging and data transfer) and stereo Bluetooth 2.1
 SNS (Social networking service) integration
 Image/Video editor
 Compass

See also
 List of Android devices

References

External links

Galaxy fit
Android (operating system) devices
Samsung smartphones
Mobile phones introduced in 2011
Mobile phones with user-replaceable battery